The Sierra de San Francisco is a mountain range in Mulegé Municipality of the northern region of Baja California Sur state, in northwestern Mexico.

Geography
The Sierra de San Francisco are on the eastern side of the Baja California Peninsula, north of the town of San Ignacio,  They are part of the Peninsular Ranges system, which extends from Southern California to the southern tip of the Baja California Peninsula.

History
Within the mountains are the prehistoric rock art pictographs of the Cochimí people, also known as the Rock Paintings of Sierra de San Francisco.

Natural history
The Sierra de San Francisco are within the El Vizcaíno Biosphere Reserve. The vegetation found in the Sierra de San Francisco range is of the Baja California Desert ecoregion. A notable tree here is the Elephant tree (Bursera microphylla).

See also
 Tres Virgenes — complex of volcanoes on southeast
 Sierra de la Giganta — range to south

References

Bibliography
 C. Michael Hogan. 2009. Elephant Tree: Bursera microphylla, GlobalTwitcher.com, ed. N. Stromberg
 Ken Hedges and James E. Workman. 1983. Rock art papers, Volume 1, Page 5, San Diego Museum of Man, 98 pages

External links
Unesco: Rock Paintings of the Sierra de San Francisco World Heritage Site

San Francisco
Peninsular Ranges
Mulegé Municipality